Tereapii Tapoki (born 9 April 1984 in Mauke) is a female discus thrower from the Cook Islands. At age twenty, Tapoki made her official debut for the 2004 Summer Olympics in Athens, where she competed in the women's discus throw. She placed fortieth in the qualifying rounds of the competition, with a throw of 48.12 metres.

At the 2008 Summer Olympics in Beijing, Tapoki improved her performance by successfully throwing the discus into the field on her third and final attempt, at 48.35 metres. Tapoki, however, failed to advance into the discus throw final, as she placed thirty-seventh overall in the qualifying rounds.

Personal bests
Shot put: 14.96 m NR – Nikao, 11 October 2006
Discus throw: 57.61 m NR – Auckland, 11 November 2006
Javelin throw: 45.85 m NR – Apia, 14 December 2006

Achievements

References

=External links
 
NBC 2008 Olympics profile
Sports reference biography

Female discus throwers
Living people
Olympic athletes of the Cook Islands
Athletes (track and field) at the 2004 Summer Olympics
Athletes (track and field) at the 2008 Summer Olympics
Commonwealth Games competitors for the Cook Islands
Athletes (track and field) at the 2006 Commonwealth Games
Athletes (track and field) at the 2018 Commonwealth Games
1984 births
Cook Island female athletes
Cook Island discus throwers
People from Mauke